Miron is a given name. In the countries with the dominant Christian Orthodox church the given name Miron was a local variant of the Greek name Myron.

In French-speaking countries Miron is a surname of unrelated origin, most likely a diminutive of Mire.  

Notable people with this given name include:

People from Israel 
 Miron Bleiberg
 Miron Livny
 Miron Ruina (born 1998), Finnish-Israeli basketball player

People from Poland 
 Miron Białoszewski
 Miron Chodakowski

People from Romania 
 Miron Cristea
 Miron Constantinescu
 Miron Costin
 Miron Cozma
 Miron Grindea
 Miron Mitrea
 Miron Nicolescu
 Miron Radu Paraschivescu
 Miron Raţiu

People from Russia 
 Miron Akimovich Ljubovsky
 Miron Merzhanov
 Miron Vovsi
 Miron Yefimovich Cherepanov
 Miron Yanovich Fyodorov

People from Ukraine 
 Myron Markevych

People from United States 
 Miron Winslow

See also 
 
 Miron (surname)

References

Romanian masculine given names
Russian masculine given names
Given names of Greek language origin